It's All Coming Back to Me Now... is a live album by David Crosby and his fourth solo effort. Chris Robinson of the Black Crowes and Graham Nash also appear on the album. Robinson duets with Crosby on "Almost Cut My Hair" and Nash appears on the last three songs.

Track listing
All tracks composed by David Crosby; except where noted.

"In My Dreams" – 6:32
"Rusty and Blue" – 7:08
"Hero" (Phil Collins, Crosby)  – 4:57
"Till It Shines on You" – 5:39
"Thousand Roads" – 5:02
"Cowboy Movie" – 9:08
"Almost Cut My Hair" – 6:10
"Déjà Vu" – 10:18
"Long Time Gone" – 5:41
"Wooden Ships" (Crosby, Paul Kantner, Stephen Stills)  – 10:36

Personnel 
 David Crosby – lead vocals, acoustic and electric guitars
 Jeff Pevar – acoustic and electric guitars
 Mike Finnigan – keyboards (3-10), backing vocals (3, 8, 9, 10)
 James "Hutch" Hutchinson – bass (2-10)
 Jody Cortez – drums (3-10)
 Kipp Lennon – backing vocals (3, 8, 9, 10)
 Graham Nash – backing vocals (8, 9, 10), harmonica (8), acoustic guitar (9, 10)
 Chris Robinson – lead and backing vocals (7)

Production 
 Producer, Engineering and Mixing – Chris "Hoover" Rankin
 Assistant Engineer – Craig Brock
 Recorded live at Whisky a Go Go (West Hollywood, CA).
 Engineered at Record Plant (Los Angeles, CA).
 Mastered by Joe Gaswirt at Oceanview Digital Mastering (Los Angeles, CA).
 Photography – Murray Close

References

1995 live albums
Atlantic Records live albums
David Crosby live albums